USS Davis (Torpedo Boat No. 12/TB-12) was launched 4 June 1898 by Wolff and Zwicker, Portland, Oregon; sponsored by Miss H. Wolff; and commissioned 10 May 1899, Lieutenant Commander R. F. Nicholson in command.

After trials Davis was placed out of commission 5 June 1899 and laid up at Mare Island Navy Yard in reserve. She was recommissioned 23 March 1908 and assigned to Pacific Torpedo Fleet. She participated in the review for the Secretary of the Navy 8 May 1908, then cruised along the west coast as far north as the Columbia River and south as far as Magdalena Bay, Mexico, until placed in reserve at Mare Island 28 October 1909.

Davis was recommissioned 1 November 1910 for service in the San Diego area until 10 May 1911 when she again went into reserve at Mare Island. In May 1912 she was towed to Puget Sound for assignment to the Pacific Reserve Fleet. She was decommissioned there 28 March 1913 and sold for scrap 21 April 1920.

References

 
 Technical data from

External links
 

 

Torpedo boats of the United States Navy
Ships built in Portland, Oregon
1898 ships